No Entrance is a 1960 Czechoslovak film directed by František Vláčil and Milan Vošmik. The film consists of 2 segments - The Chase (directed by Vláčil) and The Wandering (directed by Vošmik). Both segments are stories from life of Czechoslovk border guard.

Plot

The Chase
Young Border Guard accompanies Sergeant Major Border Guard on a patrol. They find tracks in a snow and follow them. They are met with snow storm and they get lost to each other Sergeant Major falls asleep but wakes up when he hears gunshots. He finds Young Border Guard shot. He gets him to a Rural house where a young woman lives. She tells him about suspicious man who was there. Sergeant Major goes after the saboteur and catches him as the Young Border Guard dies.

The Wandering
Lieutenant Štěpánek lives with his family in a village in Šumava near border. Štěpánek's wife Jiřina doesn't like it there and wants to return to inlands. Štěpánek doesn't want to leave his job and is unhappy with his wife's lamentations. Their son Péťa adores his father. One day Jiřina starts to pack up when Štěpánek is on duty. Péťa runs away when he finds out his father wouldn't go with them. Everybody in the village then help to find Péťa and Jiřina decides to stay.

Cast

The Chase
Zdeněk Kutil as Sergeant Major Border Guard 
Jan Němec as Young Border Guard
 Václav Irmanov as Saboteur
 Valentina Thielová as Rural Woman

The Wandering
Vladimír Hrubý as Lieutenant Štěpánek - border guard
Jiřina Švorcová as Jirina - Štěpánek's wife
Míša Staninec as Péťa - Štěpánek's son
Ota Sklenčka as Captain
Otto Lackovič as Varga
Světla Amortová as Součková
Hermína Vojtová as Endlová
František Miška as Officer
Adolf Filip as Forester

References

External links
 

1960 films
1960 crime drama films
1960s Czech-language films
Czechoslovak drama films
Films directed by František Vláčil
Czech crime drama films